20th Century Hit Song is a South Korean show. It airs on KBS Joy on Friday at 20:00 (KST).

Broadcast timeline

Format 
Describe as a "fresh take on 'newtro'", 20th Century Hit Song will revive classic K-pop hits from the 1980s and 1990s and offer modern reinterpretations of popular songs from the 20th century.

Host 
 Kim Hee-chul
 Kim Min-ah

List of episodes 
 Note that the show airs on a cable channel (pay TV), which plays part in its slower uptake and relatively small audience share when compared to programs broadcast (FTA) on public networks such as KBS, SBS, MBC or EBS.
 NR rating means "not reported". The rating is low.
 In the ratings below, the highest rating for the show will be in red each year.

2020

2021

2022

2023

Notes

References 

2020 South Korean television series debuts
Korean-language television shows
Korean Broadcasting System original programming

External link